The Theme of Sicily (Thema Sikelias) was a Byzantine province (theme) existing from the late 7th to the 10th century, encompassing the island of Sicily and the region of Calabria in the Italian mainland. Following the Muslim conquest of Sicily, from 902 the theme was limited to Calabria, but retained its original name until the middle of the 10th century.

History
Ever since its reconquest from the Ostrogoths by Belisarius in 535–536, Sicily had formed a distinct province under a praetor, while the army was placed under a dux. A strategos (military governor) is attested on the island in Arab sources between 687 and 695, and it is at that time that the island was probably made into a theme.

The theme was based in Syracuse, traditionally the chief city of Sicily. It comprised not only the island, which was divided into districts called tourmai, but also the mainland duchy of Calabria (Greek: , doukaton Kalavrias), which extended roughly up to the river Crati. In addition, the strategos of Sicily exercised some authority—varying according to the prevailing local political faction—over the autonomous duchies of Naples, Gaeta and Amalfi.

The Muslim conquest of the island began in 826. Following the fall of Syracuse in 878 and the conquest of Taormina in 902, the strategos moved to Rhegion, the capital of Calabria. During the first half of the 10th century, the Byzantines launched a number of failed expeditions to regain the island and maintained a few isolated strongholds near Messina until 965, when Rometta, the last Byzantine outpost, fell. The post of "strategos of Sicily" was thus retained as the official title until the mid-10th century, when the "strategos of Calabria" begins to appear in the lists.

List of known strategoi of Sicily
Note: Holders of the office known only from seals who can not be precisely dated are not included. Uncertain or conjectural entries are denoted in italics.

See also
Exarchate of Ravenna
History of Islam in southern Italy

References

Sources

 

Byzantine Italy
Byzantine Sicily
States and territories established in the 7th century
Themes of the Byzantine Empire